Tunnicliff-Jordan House is a historic home located at Richfield Springs in Otsego County, New York.  The house consists of three blocks. The main block was built between 1810 and 1835 and is a 2-story, four-bay, square plan building with a hipped roof.  A -story, gable-roofed frame ell dated between 1830 and 1850 extends from the rear.  A narrow single-story lean-to, originally added to the ell about 1850, was remodeled for residential use about 1939. The main entrance has a simple Greek Revival style entablature.

It was listed on the National Register of Historic Places in 2010.

References

Houses on the National Register of Historic Places in New York (state)
Greek Revival houses in New York (state)
Houses completed in 1835
Houses in Otsego County, New York
National Register of Historic Places in Otsego County, New York